Wong Tei Tung was believed to be an Upper Paleolithic settlement in Hong Kong, but it is now dated 7700 to 2200 years old.  It is located near Sham Chung, near to the Three Fathoms Cove on the Sai Kung Peninsula.

The findings were discovered by the Hong Kong Archaeological Society.

See also
 Prehistoric Hong Kong

References

Areas of Hong Kong
Tai Po District
Archaeological sites in Hong Kong